Saint-Père may refer to:

Saint-Père Lake, head water body of Saint-Père River in Quebec, Canada
Saint-Père River, a tributary of Wetetnagami River in Quebec, Canada
Saint-Père, Ille-et-Vilaine, France
Saint-Père, Nièvre, France
Saint-Père, Yonne, France

See also
 The Abbey of Saint-Père-en-Vallée a Benedictine abbey, originally outside the walls of Chartres, France